This is a list of presidents of Madagascar, since the establishment of the office of President in 1959, during the Malagasy Republic.

List of officeholders
Political parties

Other factions

Status

Timeline

Latest election

See also
 Politics of Madagascar
 List of Imerina monarchs
 List of colonial governors of Madagascar
 Prime Minister of Madagascar
 Vice President of Madagascar
 First Lady of Madagascar

Notes

External links
 World Statesmen – Madagascar

Madagascar, List of presidents of
Government of Madagascar
 
 
Presidents
Presidents